Sean William Joyce (born 15 February 1967 in Conisbrough, Yorkshire) is an English former professional footballer who made 200 appearances in the Football League playing for Doncaster Rovers, Exeter City and Torquay United. Since 1998 he has been manager of Devon non-league side Bideford of the Western Football League.

Sean Joyce began his career as an apprentice with Doncaster Rovers, making his debut prior to turning professional in September 1986. In November 1986 he joined Exeter City on loan to gain additional experience and returned to Doncaster, going on to make 41 appearances and score twice.

He moved to Torquay United on a free transfer in August 1988, playing at Wembley Stadium in the Football League Trophy Final against Bolton Wanderers, and again at Wembley in the 1991 play-off final victory on penalties against Blackpool. He remained with the Gulls after their relegation the following season before leaving league football, joining Elmore, having made 158 league appearances, scoring 15 goals, for the Gulls.

He later played for Taunton Town, but was released by Taunton in April 1998 and joined Bideford, then managed by former Torquay teammate Dean Edwards. In November 1998 he stepped up from club captain when he was appointed player-manager, though a knee injury soon made his role that of only being the manager, and he guided Bideford away from the danger of relegation. He made Bideford one of the top teams in the Western League and a serious challenger to Taunton Town's dominance of the competition since Tiverton Town's promotion.

Subsequently, Bideford have been promoted to the Evo-Stik Southern League Premier, where the team are beginning to establish themselves.

References

1967 births
Living people
English footballers
People from Conisbrough
Footballers from Doncaster
Doncaster Rovers F.C. players
Exeter City F.C. players
Torquay United F.C. players
Elmore F.C. players
Taunton Town F.C. players
Bideford A.F.C. players
English football managers
Bideford A.F.C. managers
Association football midfielders